Javier Gustavo Mancini Rios (born 19 January 1978 in Montevideo) is a former Uruguayan football player.

External links
 

1978 births
Footballers from Montevideo
Living people
Uruguayan footballers
Montevideo Wanderers F.C. players
Uruguay Montevideo players
FC Rostov players
Russian Premier League players
Uruguayan expatriate footballers
Expatriate footballers in Russia
C.D. Técnico Universitario footballers
Expatriate footballers in Ecuador
Boston River players
Association football midfielders